Physical effect may refer to:
 Physical effect or phenomenon, any thing which manifests itself
 Physical effect, a consequence of causality (physics)
 Physical effect, a therapeutic effect or adverse effect of medical treatment on the body
 Physical effect or practical effect, a special effect achieved during filming rather than in post-production

See also
List of effects